Nabbed is a New Zealand reality television show, produced with the assistance of the New Zealand Police Traffic Division for Television New Zealand's TV2. The show profiles and follows the work of traffic police officers in their patrols and other police duties.

A single series of nine episodes ran between 11 February 2014 and 8 April 2014.

See also 
 Motorway Patrol
 Ten 7 Aotearoa

References

New Zealand reality television series
2014 New Zealand television series debuts
Documentary television series about policing
TVNZ 2 original programming